Paul Kerry "Bruce" Perkins Sr. (born August 14, 1967) is a former American football running back in the National Football League who played for the Tampa Bay Buccaneers and Indianapolis Colts. He played college football for Butler Community College and the Arizona State Sun Devils. He also played in the Canadian Football League for the Hamilton Tiger-Cats and Memphis Mad Dogs.

Personal life
His older son Paul Perkins plays in the NFL. His younger son, Bryce Perkins, played quarterback for Arizona State and Virginia and plays for the Los Angeles Rams.  Their uncle, Don Perkins, played eight seasons as a running back with the Dallas Cowboys.

References

1967 births
Living people
American football running backs
Canadian football running backs
Tampa Bay Buccaneers players
Indianapolis Colts players
Hamilton Tiger-Cats players
Memphis Mad Dogs players
Arizona State Sun Devils football players